Reply may refer to:
Reply (linguistics), a response to a question
Reply (company), an information technology company based in Italy
Reply Corporation, a defunct computer hardware company based in the United States
Reply (legal term)
Reply (Google), a messaging assistance app
Reply (TV series)

See also
Response (disambiguation)
No Reply (disambiguation)